Idrottsföreningen Drott is a Finnish sports club based in Jakobstad, Ostrobothnia. Founded in 1921, the club caters for multiple sports including bowling, volleyball, gymnastics and athletics. Previously, the club had been active in football, in which the men's team won the Finnish Cup in 1957. In 1965, IF Drott ceased operations in football, and later that year, FF Jaro was established as the premier football club in Jakobstad.

Honours
 Finnish Cup
 Winners (1):  1957

Season to season

References

External links
   

1921 establishments in Finland
Association football clubs established in 1921
Defunct football clubs in Finland
Jakobstad
Multi-sport clubs in Finland